Patipan Un-Op (born October 8, 1995) is a Thai professional footballer who plays as a defender for Thai League 2 club Sukhothai.

International career
Patipan was part of Thailand U19's squad in the 2014 Hassanal Bolkiah Trophy.

Honours
Buriram United
 Thai League 1: 2015
 Thai FA Cup: 2015
 Thai League Cup: 2015
 Mekong Club Championship: 2015

References

External links
 Profile at Goal
http://th.soccerway.com/players/patipan-unop/334097/

1995 births
Living people
Patipan Un-Op
Patipan Un-Op
Patipan Un-Op
Association football defenders
Patipan Un-Op
Patipan Un-Op
Patipan Un-Op
Patipan Un-Op
Patipan Un-Op